Ilayangudi taluk is a taluk of Sivagangai district of the Indian state of Tamil Nadu. The headquarters of the taluk is the town of Ilayangudi

Demographics
According to the 2011 census, the taluk of Ilayangudi had a population of 109,160 with 53,953  males and 55,207 females. There were 1023 women for every 1000 men. The taluk had a literacy rate of 70.16. Child population in the age group below 6 was 4,750 Males and 4,810 Females.

References 

Taluks of Sivaganga district